Cape Verdean Angolan are Angolan residents whose ancestry originated in Cape Verde.

In 1995, it was estimated that there were 10,000 people of Cape Verdean descent in Angola.

See also
 Angola–Cape Verde relations

References

External links
Central Intelligence Agency.  "Angola."  The World Factbook.  Retrieved October 19, 2007.

Angola
Ethnic groups in Angola